Lewis Roberts (born 2 July 1985) is an English professional snooker player. He became a professional in 2008, however he did not retain his place on the tour at the end of the 2008–09 season.

Career

Born in 1985, Roberts played in the Pontin's International Open Series (known as PIOS) in the 2000s, hoping to earn a place on the professional main tour. He was able to do this in 2008, but his first season was without any success; he won only three matches – 4–3 over Barry Pinches in the Masters qualifying event, 5–2 over Vincent Muldoon in the China Open and 10–8 over Aditya Mehta in the World Championship.

In his other nine matches, Roberts lost 1–5 to Wayne Cooper, Atthasit Mahitthi, Rod Lawler and Mark Joyce, 8–9 to Mahitthi in the 2008 UK Championship and 7–10 to Paul Davies in the World Championship, but never failed to win a frame in any tournament.

Roberts was ranked 86th at the conclusion of the season, and was therefore relegated from the professional tour in 2009.

He attempted to regain his place by playing in the PIOS events during the 2009/2010 season, but won only one match, in Event 3. He compiled his first competitive century break, a 126, against Jamie Jones in Event 7, but lost the match 1–4 and did not enter a tournament thereafter.

References

External links
 
 World Snooker.com 
 Profile on Pro Snooker Blog

Living people
English snooker players
1985 births